Lu Min is the name of:

 Lu Min (aviator) (1926–2000), Chinese flying ace during the Korean War 
 Lu Min (actor) (born 1970), Burmese film actor and director
 Lu Min (writer) (born 1973), Chinese writer

See also
Min Lu (1954–2013), Burmese writer